Stahl Gubag (born 17 July 1999) is a Papua New Guinean footballer who plays as a midfielder. He made his debut for the Papua New Guinea national football team on 14 November 2016 against Malaysia, the game ended in a 2-1 loss.

References

1999 births
Living people
Papua New Guinean footballers
Association football defenders
Papua New Guinea international footballers